Amphidromus mariae is a species of air-breathing tree snail. It is an arboreal gastropod mollusk in the family Camaenidae.

Morphology 
Medium-sized sinistral shell with black outer lip and black or brown axial stripes. According to the original description, the shell has orange subsutural, while specimens with scarlet subsutural are also recorded.

Distribution 
Central Vietnam, Đắk Lắk Province.

Habitat 
Tree dwellers.

Etymology 

This species is named after Maria Senders, a Canadian landsnail lover who assisted a lot in the collecting trip.

References 

mariae
Gastropods described in 2017